Hillgrove  is an unincorporated community located in the southern San Gabriel Valley of eastern Los Angeles County, California.  The population in 1960 was 14,669.

A former section was a census-designated place, that became part of neighboring Hacienda Heights after the 1970 census.

Geography
Hillgrove is located at 34.017 degrees north latitude and 117.98 degrees west longitude. The community of Avocado Heights is to the west, the Puente Hills are to the south, and Hacienda Heights is to the southeast.

The ZIP Code serving the community is 91745.

Education
The community is part of the Hacienda-Puente Unified School District. Hillgrove Center Preschool is located in the community.

References

Unincorporated communities in Los Angeles County, California
Communities in the San Gabriel Valley
Former census-designated places in California
Hacienda Heights, California
Unincorporated communities in California